Year 1370 (MCCCLXX) was a common year starting on Tuesday (link will display the full calendar) of the Julian calendar.

Events 
 January–December 
 April 9 – Timur becomes first Amir of the Timurid Empire, following the Siege of Balkh which establishes his rule over the Chagatai Khanate, completing his conquest of Central Asia and parts of Persia.
 May 24 – The Treaty of Stralsund ends the war between Denmark and the Hanseatic League.
 September 19 – Hundred Years' War: Siege of Limoges – The English led by Edward the Black Prince retake the city from the French by storm with wide destruction, effectively ending the Limoges enamel industry.
 October 20 – Philip of Anjou, Titular Emperor of Constantinople, marries as his second wife Elizabeth of Slavonia (daughter of Stephen of Anjou and Margaret of Bavaria).
 November 5 – Casimir III the Great, king of Poland, dies as the result of a hunting accident, and is succeeded jointly by his sister, Elizabeth of Kujavia, and her son, Louis I of Hungary, beginning the rule of the country by the Capet-Anjou family.
 November 15 – Trần Nghệ Tông deposes Dương Nhật Lễ as emperor of Đại Việt, modern-day Vietnam.
 December 4 – Hundred Years' War: Battle of Pontvallain – A French army under Bertrand du Guesclin heavily defeats an English force in surprise attacks in northwest France.
 December 20 – Pope Gregory XI succeeds Pope Urban V, as the 201st pope.

 Date unknown 
 For the second time since 1368, the Grand Duchy of Moscow attacks Tver, which again counter-attacks, with the aid of the Grand Duchy of Lithuania and the Blue Horde.
 Khun Luang Pa-Ngua, ruler of Suphanburi, marches and usurps the throne of the Ayutthaya Kingdom.
 The city of Xi'an in Ming dynasty China is given a new defensive city wall.
 Hugues Aubriot begins construction of the fortress of the Bastille in Paris.
 The steel crossbow is first used as a weapon of war.

Births 
 April 11 – Frederick I, Elector of Saxony (d. 1428)
 July 23 – Pier Paolo Vergerio the Elder, Italian humanist (d. 1444 or 1445)
 date unknown
 Erasmo of Narni, Italian mercenary (d. 1443)
 Guarino da Verona, Italian humanist (d. 1460)
 John VII Palaiologos, Byzantine Emperor (d. 1408)
 King Olav IV of Norway (d. 1387)
 Jan Piast, Duke of Ziebice (d. 1428)
 Jan Sindel, Polish scientist (d. 1443)
 probable
 Joan of Navarre, Queen of England, Duchess regent of Brittany (d. 1437)
 John Lydgate, English Benedictine monk and poet (d. 1451)
 Paulus Vladimiri, Polish scholar (d. 1435)
 Duke William of Austria (d. 1406)

Deaths 
 May 31 – St. Vitalis of Assisi, Italian hermit (b. 1295)
 c. September 20 – Edward of Angoulême, French-born royal prince of England (b. 1365)
 November 5 – Casimir III the Great, King of Poland (b. 1310)
 December 19 – Pope Urban V (b. 1310)
 date unknown
 Simeon Uroš, Emperor of Serbs and Greeks and half-brother of Stefan Dušan (b. 1326)
 Vedanta Desika, Indian Hindu guru and poet (b. 1269)
 Yang Weizhen, Chinese painter (b. c. 1296)
 Toghon Temür, Emperor Huizong of Yuan dynasty China (b. 1320)
 probable date – Empress Gi of Yuan dynasty China (b. 1315)

References